Strawberry Shortcake: Let's Dance is a 2007 American animated film that was released on October 2, 2007 by 20th Century Fox Home Entertainment, although it was given an early release by Kidtoon Films on September 1 in select Cinemas.

Plot
Like with the other DVDs of Strawberry Shortcake, Let's Dance uses a "Compilation" format where Strawberry recalls the featured episodes in her "Remembering Book". The episodes featured on this DVD are Dancin' in Disguise and Meet Apricot.

Dancin' in Disguise (Everybody Dance)
The Purple Pieman uses the girls' passion of dance to disguise Sour Grapes as a dance teacher to distract the girls, only for Sour to have a change of heart when she begins to enjoy teaching the girls.

Meet Apricot (Let's Dance)
A new girl named Apricot moves into Strawberryland. However, she makes up tall tales to try to blend into the group, but she soon learns that one doesn't need tall tales to have someone like them.

Soundtrack
The soundtrack album, from Koch Records, debuted on September 25, more than a week before the film's DVD premiere. It also contains music for Berry Blossom Festival and an then-upcoming DVD release, Berry Big Journeys.

References

External links
 
 

2007 films
Television series by DIC Entertainment
Strawberry Shortcake films
2000s American animated films
DIC Entertainment films
20th Century Fox direct-to-video films
20th Century Fox animated films
2000s English-language films
2000s French films